Tanzania competed at the 2022 Commonwealth Games in Birmingham, England between 28 July and 8 August 2022. It was Tanzania's fourteenth appearance at the Games.

Medalists

Competitors
It is expected that Tanzania will send a contingent of 17 competitors to the Games.

The following is the list of number of competitors participating at the Games per sport/discipline.

Athletics

Men
Track and road events

Women
Track and road events

Boxing

As of 26 May 2022, a squad of three boxers will take part in the competition.

Men

Judo

As of 26 May 2022, a squad of two judoka will take part in the competition.

Para powerlifting

Swimming

As of 26 May 2022, a squad of two swimmers will take part in the competition.

Men

Women

References

External links
Tanzania Olympic Committee Official site

Nations at the 2022 Commonwealth Games
Tanzania at the Commonwealth Games
2022 in Tanzanian sport